The 2016 Chicago Fire season was the club's 21st year of existence, as well as their 19th season in Major League Soccer and their 19th consecutive year in the top-flight of American soccer.

On November 24, 2015 Veljko Paunović, coach of the 2015 World Cup champions Serbia U-20 team, was announced as the Chicago Fire's new head coach.

Chicago Fire began the regular season on March 6, 2016 with a home match against New York City FC.  The Men in Red finished the regular season on October 23, 2016 with an away match against Toronto FC. The club has missed the playoffs for the sixth time in the past seven years.

The loss on the road to Vancouver Whitecaps on May 11, 2016 was the Fire's 28th straight match (19L, 9T) without a road win.  This surpassed the New York Red Bulls for the longest road winless streak in MLS history.  With the away loss to Real Salt Lake on August 6, 2016 the streak extended to 36 matches (27L, 9T).  The two-years and 28 days long streak finally ended when the Fire defeated Montreal Impact, 3-0, on the road on August 20, 2016.  It was the first victory away from home since the Fire beat the New England Revolution, 1-0, in Foxborough, MA on July 12, 2014.

Chicago Fire became the first team in MLS history to finish last in the overall table two years in a row.

Squad at the end of the season 
As of October 23, 2016. Source: Chicago Fire official roster

Player movement

In 
Per Major League Soccer and club policies terms of the deals do not get disclosed.

Out 

 Players selected in 2016 MLS SuperDraft, but ultimately not signed: midfielder Jack Harrison (1st overall, first round, from Wake Forest University) - traded to New York City FC, midfielder Vincent Mitchell (62nd overall, fourth round, from Butler University) and defender/midfielder Vincent Keller (57th overall, third round, from Creighton University).
 Trialists released in the preseason: defender James Musa, midfielder Parker Maher (Saint Louis FC), goalkeeper Zach Bennett (winner of the Open Tryout), defender Benedikt Krug, defender Mauricio Pineda (Chicago Fire Academy), goalkeeper Callum Irving, goalkeeper Matt Bersano and midfielder Christian Volesky.

Loans 
Per Major League Soccer and club policies terms of the deals do not get disclosed.

In

Technical staff

Standings

Eastern Conference table

Overall table

Results summary

Results

Match results

Preseason 
Kickoff times are in CST (UTC-06)

Simple™ Invitational

Major League Soccer 

Kickoff times are in CDT (UTC-05), unless posted otherwise

U.S. Open Cup 

The Chicago Fire entered the 2016 U.S. Open Cup with the rest of Major League Soccer in the fourth round.
Kickoff times are in CDT (UTC-05)

Stats

Leading scorers

Italics indicate player who departed the club during the season.
Updated to match played on October 23, 2016.Source: MLSsoccer.com statistics - 2016 Chicago Fire

Appearances and goals

|-
|colspan="14"|Players currently out on loan with another club: (Statistics shown are the appearances made and goals scored while at Chicago Fire)

|-
|colspan="14"|Players who left the club during the season: (Statistics shown are the appearances made and goals scored while at Chicago Fire)

|}

Goalkeeper stats

Source: Chicago Fire goalkeeper stats

National team participation 
Four Fire players have been called up to play for their senior national teams during this season.

Recognition

MLS Goal of the Week

MLS Team of the Week

MLS All-Star Game

MLS 24 under 24
Chicago Fire midfielder Matt Polster was selected to Major League Soccer's "24 under 24" list, an annual ranking of the top players in the league under the age of 24.

Team annual awards
Forward/midfielder David Accam was named the team's Most Valuable Player and Golden Boot winner for the second year in a row in both categories.  In 24 league matches Accam scored nine goals and had five assists.  Accam also had team-high 14 goals across all competitions of the season.

In his first year with the club Johan Kappelhof was named the Defensive Player of the Year. Tied with Jonathan Campbell for a team-high 33 league appearances, Kappelhof made 85 clearances, 17 blocks and 113 interceptions during his first MLS campaign.

Goalkeeper Sean Johnson was chosen Section 8 Chicago Supporters' Player of the Year.

Kits

Primary kit 
The new primary kit for 2016 season was officially unveiled on January 25, 2016.  The jersey features an all-red design with the return of the iconic white bar across the chest.  The Chicago city flag embossed on the lower front for the jersey's jock tag.

Secondary kit 
According to the league's bi-annual rotation of kits the secondary kit carried over from the previous season.
It was originally unveiled on March 2, 2015.  The design and details were inspired by the City of Chicago flag.

Draft pick trades 
Picks acquired:
 2016 MLS SuperDraft second round pick from D.C. United in exchange for forward Patrick Nyarko.
 2016 MLS SuperDraft third round pick from New York Red Bulls in exchange for goalkeeper Kyle Reynish.
 2017 MLS SuperDraft natural first round pick from Philadelphia Union in exchange for the top spot in the MLS Allocation Ranking Order.
 2019 MLS SuperDraft natural third round pick from D.C. United in exchange for forward Kennedy Igboananike.

Picks traded:
 2016 MLS SuperDraft conditional pick to Los Angeles Galaxy in exchange for Greg Cochrane.
 2016 MLS SuperDraft natural second round pick to Orlando City SC in exchange for Eric Gehrig.
 2017 MLS SuperDraft natural second round pick to Columbus Crew SC in exchange for the Discovery Priority on Khaly Thiam (however, pursuant to the trade agreement, if Thiam starts in 12 or more 2016 MLS regular season games, or if his loan is extended or successfully converted into a transfer following the 2016 season, Columbus will receive General Allocation Money instead of the SuperDraft pick).

References

External links 
 

Chicago Fire FC seasons
Chicago Fire Soccer Club
Chicago Fire Soccer Club
Chicago Fire